Milano Affori is a railway station in the Affori neighborhood of Milan, Italy.

The present station was opened in 2011, connected to the Affori FN station on Line 3 of the Milan Metro. The old station, which is now closed, was built in 1879 and located about 0.5 km south of the current station.

Services
Milano Affori is served by lines S2 and S4 of the Milan suburban railway network, and by the Milano Cadorna–Asso regional line; all the lines are operated by the Lombard railway company Trenord.

References

External links
 

Affori
Ferrovienord stations
Railway stations opened in 2011
2011 establishments in Italy
Milan S Lines stations
Railway stations in Italy opened in the 21st century